Ayna Mahmud gizi Sultanova (1895 – 1938) was an Azerbaijani Communist party activist and statesperson. She was one of the first Azerbaijani female revolutionaries and in 1938, became the first Azerbaijani female cabinet minister.

Life and career
Ayna Sultanova (née Musabeyova) was born in 1895 in the village of Pirəbədil, 15 kilometres east of the modern-day city of Shabran. She was the sister of Gazanfar Musabekov who later became a Bolshevik revolutionary and Chair of the Council of People's Commissars of Azerbaijan, the highest governing body of the republic. In 1912, she graduated from Saint Nino Gymnasium in Baku and later briefly taught at that school. In 1917, she became interested in Bolshevik ideas and on 1918, joined the Russian Communist Party (which later became the Communist Party of the Soviet Union). In 1919, she moved to Astrakhan, then to Moscow where she worked at the Middle Eastern bureau of the People's Commissariat of Russia for Foreign Affairs. In 1920, she went back to already Sovietised Azerbaijan and until 1930, worked in different administrative positions related to women's affairs. In 1923, she also became the editor-in-chief of Sharg Gadyny, a Communist magazine aimed at women's emancipation.

Between 1937 and 1938, Sultanova worked as Deputy People's Commissar (Minister) of Education, then as the People's Commissar of Justice. She was also a student at the Institute of Red Professors. For her services to the Soviet state, Sultanova was awarded the Order of the Red Banner of Labour.

She was married to Hamid Sultanov, Chair of the Council of People's Commissars of the Nakhchivan ASSR. In 1938, in the wake of the Great Purge, both of them, along with Ayna Sultanova's brother Gazanfar Musabekov, were arrested on counter-revolution charges and executed by firing squad shortly afterwards.

There is a street named after Ayna Sultanova in Ganja and a monument dedicated to her in Baku.

References
 

1895 births
1938 deaths
People from Shabran District
People from Baku Governorate
Azerbaijani communists
Azerbaijani revolutionaries
Prosecutors General of Azerbaijan 
Prosecutors of the Azerbaijan Soviet Socialist Republic
Soviet Azerbaijani people
Executed politicians
Executed Azerbaijani women
Great Purge victims from Azerbaijan
20th-century Azerbaijani women politicians
20th-century Azerbaijani politicians
Azerbaijani feminists
Female revolutionaries
Women government ministers of Azerbaijan
Members of the Communist Party of the Soviet Union executed by the Soviet Union